Jacob Alan Lemoine (born November 28, 1993) is an American professional baseball pitcher who is a free agent. He made his Major League Baseball (MLB) debut in 2022 for the Oakland Athletics.

High school and college
Lemoine attended Bridge City High School in Bridge City, Texas. He was drafted in the 21st round, 666th overall, of the 2012 MLB draft by the Texas Rangers but did not sign. He attended the University of Houston for three years (2013–2015), playing college baseball for the Cougars. He played for the 2014 USA Baseball Collegiate National Team, going 2–2 with a 2.45 ERA in  innings for them. During his junior year of 2015, he suffered a right shoulder injury that limited him to just 5 games that season.

Professional career

Texas Rangers
He was drafted in the 4th round, 108th overall, of the 2015 MLB draft by the Texas Rangers and signed with them for a $528,000 bonus.
Lemoine did not appear in a professional game in 2015 and 2016, after dealing with right shoulder problems that led to rotator cuff surgery. He made his professional debut in 2017 with the Hickory Crawdads of the Class A South Atlantic League, going 3–4 with a 2.96 ERA in 70 innings. He spent the 2018 season with the Down East Wood Ducks of the Class A-Advanced Carolina League, going 3–4 with a 2.40 ERA in 56 innings. He split the 2019 season between the Frisco RoughRiders of the Double-A Texas League and the Nashville Sounds of the Triple-A Pacific Coast League, going a combined 2–2 with a 4.45 ERA over  innings. Lemoine did not play in 2020 due to the cancellation of the Minor League Baseball season because of the COVID-19 pandemic. Lemoine spent the 2021 season with the Round Rock Express of the Triple-A West, going 7–4 with a 2.86 ERA and 43 strikeouts over  innings. He became a free agent following the 2021 season.

Oakland Athletics
On January 8, 2022, Lemoine signed a minor league contract with the Oakland Athletics.

On April 7, the Athletics selected Lemoine's contract, adding him to their opening day roster. He was designated for assignment on July 12. He elected free agency on November 10, 2022.

References

External links

Houston Cougars bio

Living people
1993 births
People from Nederland, Texas
Baseball players from Texas
Major League Baseball pitchers
Oakland Athletics players
Houston Cougars baseball players
Hickory Crawdads players
Down East Wood Ducks players
Frisco RoughRiders players
Nashville Sounds players
Round Rock Express players
Las Vegas Aviators players